Muthurangam Govt. Arts College (MGAC) is located in Bagayam, Vellore, Tamil Nadu, India. The college is affiliated with Thiruvalluvar University. This college offers different courses in arts, commerce and science.

History
Muthurangam Govt. Arts College was inaugurated on 1965 by then Chief Minister Hon'able. Backthavachalam.

Department and Courses
 Department of Tamil
 Department of English
 Department of History
 Department of Economics
 Department of Mathematics
 Department of Physics
 Department of Chemistry
 Department of Computer Science
 Department of Zoology
 Department of Commerce
 Department of Business Administration
 Department of Nutrition & Dietetics

Course offered : 
 Under Graduate
 BA Economics EM & TM
 BA English Literature (Shift I & II)
 BA History EM & TM
 BA Tamil Literature
 BBA
 BCom (Shift I & II)
 BSc Chemistry EM & TM (Shift I & II)
 BSc Computer Science (Shift I & II)
 BSc Mathematics EM & TM (Shift I & II)
 BSc Nutrition & Dietetics
 BSc Physics EM & TM
 BSc Zoology EM & TM

 Post Graduate
 MA Economics
 MA English
 MA History
 MA Tamil
 MBA
 MCom
 MSc Chemistry
 MSc Computer Science
 MSc Mathematics
 MSc Physics
 MSc Foods and Nutrition 
 M.phil 
 M.phil courses available some major courses

 PH.d
 Also available PH.D in some courses

References

External links

Arts colleges in India
Universities and colleges in Vellore district
Educational institutions established in 1965
1965 establishments in Madras State
Colleges affiliated to Thiruvalluvar University
Academic institutions formerly affiliated with the University of Madras